Veulen (Limburgs: ´t Väöle) is a village in the municipality of Venray in Limburg, Netherlands.

The village was first mentioned in 1590 as Vairloe, and probably means "open forest located in front". Even though the current name translates to calf, there is no relation.

Gallery

References 

Venray
Populated places in Limburg (Netherlands)